Gaomidian Subdistrict is a subdistrict situated on the northern side of Daxing District, Beijing, China. It borders Xihongmen Town to its north, Guanyinsi Subdistrict to its east, Qingyuan Subdistrict to its south, as wel as Huangcun Town and Huaxiang Subdistrict to its west. It was home to 99,959 people as of 2020.

The subdistrict was created from the northern section of Qingyuan Subdistrict in 2014.

Administrative divisions 

At the end of 2021, Gaomidian Subdistrict was composed of the following 19 communities:

See also 

 List of township-level divisions of Beijing

References 

Daxing District
Subdistricts of Beijing